Athoracophorus bitentaculatus, is a species of land slug, a terrestrial gastropod mollusc in the family Athoracophoridae.

Distribution 
A. bitentaculatus is endemic to New Zealand.

Ecology 
Parasites of Athoracophorus bitentaculatus include:
 Hugotdiplogaster neozelandia (Nematoda, Diplogasteridae) is parasiting in the penis and in the oviduct

References

Further reading 
 Barker G. M. (1978). "A reappraisal of Athoracophorus bitentaculatus, with comments on the validity of genus Reflectopallium (Gastropoda: Athoracophoridae)". New Zealand Journal of Zoology 5(2): 281–288.
 Burton D. W. (1978). "Anatomy, histology, and function of the reproductive system of the tracheopulmonate slug Athoracophorus bitentaculatus (Quoy and Gaimard)". Zoology Publications from Victoria University of Wellington 68: 1-16.
 Powell A. W. B. (1979). New Zealand Mollusca, William Collins Publishers Ltd, Auckland, New Zealand, 
 Burton D. W. (1963). "New Zealand Land Slugs—Part 2". Tuatara 11(2): 90–96.

External links 

 Citizen science observations

Athoracophoridae
Gastropods described in 1832
Endemic fauna of New Zealand
Molluscs of New Zealand
Endemic molluscs of New Zealand